Ranirbazar is a town and a Municipal Council in West Tripura  district in the Indian state of Tripura.

Overview
The town of Ranirbazar has many amenities like town hall, schools, market, motorstand, petro-pump and so on. Earlier, Tripura government had declared Ranir bazar as a municipal council area.

Demographics
 India census, Ranirbazar had a population of 11,003. Males constitute 51% of the population and females 49%. Ranirbazar has an average literacy rate of 77%, higher than the national average of 59.5%: male literacy is 82%, and female literacy is 72%. In Ranirbazar, 10% of the population is under 6 years of age.

Location
Ranirbazar is located on the National Highway 8 (Assam-Agartala highway) on the banks of river Haora. It is half an hour distance from Agartala by vehicle. Nearby urban areas include Khayerpur and Jirania.

References

See also
 List of cities and towns in Tripura
 Khumulwng, the headquarters of TTAADC.
 Udaipur.
 Sabroom.

Cities and towns in West Tripura district